A special election for Alabama's 1st congressional district was held following the resignation of Jo Bonner on August 2, 2013, to become vice chancellor for the University of Alabama. Primary elections were held on September 24. A runoff in the Republican primary took place on November 5 and the general election was pushed back to December 17. Republican Bradley Byrne won the election by a wide margin in the strongly conservative district.

Republican primary

Candidates

Declared
 Bradley Byrne, former state senator and candidate for Governor of Alabama in 2010
 Daniel Dyas, builder
 Chad Fincher, state representative
 Wells Griffith, former RNC deputy chief of staff
 Quin Hillyer, newspaper columnist
 Jessica James, real estate agent, candidate for the Alabama State Board of Education in 2012 and candidate for the Tuscaloosa City Council in 2005
 Sharon Powe, entrepreneur, legal assistant for the U.S. Small Business Administration and candidate for the Alabama House of Representatives in 2010
 David Thornton, retired Shell production specialist and retail employee
 Dean Young, businessman and candidate for the seat in 2012

Declined
 Jim Barton, state representative
 Randy Brinson, political activist and gastroenterologist
 Ben Brooks, Mobile County Circuit Judge and former state senator
 Greg Callahan
 Sam Cochran, Mobile County Sheriff 
 Jeff Collier, Mayor of Dauphin Island
 Robert Craft, Mayor of Gulf Shores
 Randy Davis, state representative
 Tucker Dorsey, Baldwin County Commissioner
 Victor Gaston, state representative
 Rusty Glover, state senator
 Peter Gounares, real estate agent and candidate for the seat in 2010 and 2012
 Bill Hightower, state senator
 Connie Hudson, Mobile County Commissioner
 Tim Kant, Mayor of Fairhope
 Tony Kennon, Orange Beach Mayor
 Albert Lipscomb, former Baldwin County Commissioner
 Hoss Mack, Baldwin County Sheriff
 Stephen Nodine, former Mobile County Commissioner and Baldwin County Jail inmate
 Trip Pittman, state senator
 Ashley Rich, Mobile District Attorney
 Pete Riehm, real estate agent and candidate for the seat in 2012
 Tim Russell, Baldwin County Probate Judge
 Sandy Stimpson, Mobile Mayor-Elect
 Robert Wilters, Baldwin County Circuit Judge

Endorsements

Polling

Results

Runoff

Polling

Results

Democratic primary

Candidates

Declared
 Lula Albert-Kaigler, retired self-employed worker
 Burton LeFlore, real estate agent

Declined
 Regina Benjamin, Surgeon General of the United States
 Napoleon Bracy, State Representative
 Lucy Buffett, businesswoman
 Vivian Davis Figures, state senator
 Sam Jones, Mayor of Mobile
 Marc Keahey, state senator

Results

Independent

Candidates

Declared
 James Hall, former Marine

General election

Results

References

External links
Election coverage at Ballotpedia
Campaign contributions at OpenSecrets
Bradley Byrne for Congress, Republican nominee
James Hall for Congress, independent
Burton LeFlore for Congress, Democratic nominee

1st congressional district special election
Alabama 01
2013 01 special
Alabama 2013 01
Alabama 2013 01
United States House of Representatives 2013 01